The Khomeini family, also transliterated as Khomeyni, is an Iranian religious Shia family that migrated from Nishapur, to Awadh in the 18th-century, and then finally settling in Khomeyn in the early 19th-century. They claim descent from the seventh Shiite Imam, Musa al-Kadhim, and hence are a Musawi family.

History and lineage 
The family did not hold a specific surname before 1921, they would normally go by Hindi, which meant "from India", since their grandfather had migrated from there. However, after the 1921 Persian coup d'état, when Reza Shah passed a law ordering all Iranians to take a surname; Ruhullah chose for himself the surname Khomeini (from Khomeyn), whilst his brother Morteza chose Pasandideh, and Nur al-Din chose Hindi. 

The lineage of the Khomeini family is as follows:Ruhullah bin Mostafa bin Ahmed bin Dīn Ali Shah bin Safdar bin Amīr al-Dīn bin Ḥasan  bin Yaḥya bin ʿAbd al-Hadī bin Nowrooz bin Ḥasan bin ʿAbd al-Ghanī bin Muḥammad bin Ḥaidar bin Ḥamza bin Musa al-Kāthim bin Jaʿfar as-Sādiq bin Muḥammad al-Bāqir bin ʿAli al-Sajjad bin Ḥusayn al-Shahid bin ʿAli Ibna Abi Talib.

Notable members

First generation 

 Ahmad Hindi (1800-1869) was the son of Din Ali Shah, he was an alim. He left India, escaping colonial rule in 1830, migrating to Najaf, and then finally settling in Khomeyn in 1834.

Second generation 

 Mostafa Hindi (1862–1903) was the son of Ahmed Hindi, he was a cleric, and was killed months after the birth of his son Ruhollah, over his activism targeting wealthy landowners.

Third generation 

 Morteza Pasandideh (1898–1986) was the son of Mostafa Hindi, he was a scholar and poet.
 Nur al-Din Hindi (1898–1986) was the son of Mostafa Hindi, he was an alim and lead the prayers in the Abbas shrine. He is buried in the Husayn shrine.
 Ruhollah Khomeini (1900–1989) was the son of Mostafa Hindi, he was an Iranian politician, revolutionary, and cleric. He was the founder of the Islamic Republic of Iran and the leader of the 1979 Iranian Revolution, which saw the overthrow of the last Shah of Iran, Mohammad Reza Pahlavi. Following the revolution, Khomeini became the country's Supreme Leader, a position created in the constitution of the Islamic Republic as the highest-ranking political and religious authority of the nation, which he held until his death.

Fourth generation 

 Mostafa Khomeini (1930–1977) was the son of Ruhullah Khomeini, he died before the Iranian revolution.
 Ahmad Khomeini (1946–1995) was the son of Ruhullah Khomeini, he was the main assistant of his father before, during and after the Iranian Revolution. He acted as the link between his father and the officials and people. He had several decision-making positions.

Fifth generation 

 Hussain Khomeini (born 1959) is the son of Mostafa Khomeini, he is a cleric, and is considered a liberal secularist and an outspoken critic of the theocratic government in Iran.
 Hassan Khomeini (born 1972) is the son of Ahmad Khomeini, he is a cleric and was appointed caretaker of the Mausoleum of Khomeini in 1995 where his grandfather and father are buried. He pursued a political career in 2015, and ran for the Assembly of Experts in the 2016 election. His nomination, however was rejected by the Guardian Council.
 Yasser Khomeini is the son of Ahmad Khomeini, he is a cleric and orator.
 Ali Khomeini is the son of Ahmad Khomeini

Sixth generation 

 Ahmad Khomeini (born 1997) is the son of Hassan Khomeini. He is a cleric. It is said that he is often targeted, for being the son of Hassan Khomeini, someone Iran's conservative institutions are suspicious of due to their perceived sympathy for reformers.

Pictures

Family tree

References

Political families of Iran
Ruhollah Khomeini